Aruvalla is a village in Rae Parish, Harju County, in northern Estonia. It has a population of 120 (as of 1 January 2010).

Population

References

External links
Unofficial website 

Villages in Harju County
Articles which contain graphical timelines